Centro Ameghino is a hospital in Buenos Aires, Argentina. It was founded in 1948 by the Ministry of Health, and was initially designated as the "Institute of Applied Psychopathology"

Notes

Hospital buildings completed in 1948
Balvanera
Hospitals in Buenos Aires